Isaiah Nathan Johnson (born May 16, 1992) is an American football safety who is currently a free agent. He played college football at Georgia Tech, and signed as an undrafted free agent with the Detroit Lions in 2015.

High school career
Johnson attended and played high school football for Sandy Creek High School in Tyrone, Georgia. He earned all-state, all-region, and all-county honors as safety in 2009, when he helped lead Sandy Creek to the state championship. He was on the academic honor roll.

College career
Attending Georgia Tech, Johnson started three games in his freshman year in 2010, and was a starter thereafter. He was injured at the end of his junior year, and sat out the following season. He played in 2014 as a redshirt senior. He finished his college career with 283 tackles, which were the most by any Georgia Tech defensive back.

Professional career

Detroit Lions
Johnson went undrafted in the 2015 NFL Draft. He was signed by the Detroit Lions as an undrafted free agent before spring training for a $12,000 signing bonus. He was among the final cuts of spring training in 2015, but was signed off the practice squad on November 14 of that year.

On September 3, 2016, Johnson was waived by the Lions.

Los Angeles Rams
On September 6, 2016, Johnson was signed to the Los Angeles Rams' practice squad. He was promoted to the active roster on September 23, 2016. He was released on September 28, 2016 and re-signed to the practice squad. He was promoted back to the active roster on December 19, 2016.

On September 2, 2017, Johnson was waived by the Rams and was signed to the practice squad the next day. He was promoted to the active roster on November 3, 2017. He was waived by the Rams on November 7, 2017 and was re-signed to the practice squad. He was promoted back to the active roster on December 13, 2017.

On September 18, 2018, Johnson was waived by the Rams.

Indianapolis Colts
On January 14, 2019, Johnson signed a reserve/future contract with the Indianapolis Colts. He was waived on April 30, 2019, but was re-signed a few weeks later. He was waived/injured on August 31, 2019 and was placed on injured reserve.

References

External links
 Los Angeles Rams bio

1992 births
Living people
People from Tyrone, Georgia
Sportspeople from the Atlanta metropolitan area
Players of American football from Georgia (U.S. state)
American football safeties
Georgia Tech Yellow Jackets football players
Detroit Lions players
Los Angeles Rams players
Indianapolis Colts players